1998–99 Ukrainian First League was the eighth season of the Ukrainian First League which was won by FC Dynamo-2 Kyiv. The season started on July 31, 1998, and finished on July 4, 1999.

Promotion and relegation

Promoted teams
Two clubs promoted from the 1997-98 Ukrainian Second League through a promotion/relegation play-off tournament.
Group A
 FC Podillya Khmelnytskyi – champion (returning after a season)
Group C
 FC Shakhtar-2 Donetsk – champion (returning after six seasons)

Relegated teams 
Two clubs were relegated from the 1997-98 Ukrainian Top League:
 FC Chornomorets Odesa – 15th place (debut)
 FC Torpedo Zaporizhia – 16th place (debut)

Renamed teams
 FC Nyva Vinnytsia changed its name to FC Vinnytsia at winter break.
 FC Yavir Krasnopillia moved to Sumy from Krasnopillia and changed its name to FC Yavir-Sumy at winter break.

Teams

Standings

Promotion play-off

FC Cherkasy failed to obtain berth in the Top League.

Top scorers 
Statistics are taken from here.

See also
1998–99 Ukrainian Second League
1998–99 Ukrainian Premier League

Notes

References

 The main source

External links 
 Professional Football League of Ukraine - website of the professional football league of Ukraine 

Ukrainian First League seasons
2
Ukra